Oba Esigie was the son of Oba Ozolua, who reigned in about 1481, and his second wife, Queen Idia. Oba Esigie ruled the ancient Benin Kingdom, now Benin City, Edo State, Nigeria (c.1504 – c.1550). Works of art commissioned by Esigie are held in prominent museums including the Metropolitan Museum of Art and the British Museum.

Following a bitter power struggle with Arhuaran, and with major assistance and support from his mother Idia, Esigie gathered the Benin army at Unuame on the river Osse and from there launched an attack and overthrew Arhuanran. Esigie became Oba of Benin and would later fend off an attack from the Igala people. 

Esigie started a tradition in Benin by abolishment of the killing of the king's mother, giving Idia the title of Iyoba (or Queen Mother), and providing the Eguae-Iyoba (Palace of the Queen Mother) in lower Uselu for her use. Idia was responsible for many cultural innovations that still hold strong in Benin’s cultural history; she notably dressed as a man marched alongside her son and led Benin to victory during in the Idah battle of 1515. When Idia died, her protege and Esigie's wife Elaba would go to support the Oba until his death .

References

External links
 50 Great Africans - Oba Esigie & Oba Ewuare Accessed 10 January 2007
 The correct History of Edo Accessed 10 January 2007

16th-century monarchs in Africa
Obas of Benin
Edo people
16th-century Nigerian people